Jack Sullivan was an Ireland international footballer.

International career
In 1928, Sullivan made his only appearance for Ireland scoring a penalty in a 4–2 win over Belgium in Liège.

References

Association football defenders
Republic of Ireland association footballers
Republic of Ireland international footballers
Fordsons F.C. players
League of Ireland players
Year of birth missing
Association footballers from Cork (city)
Year of death missing